Vahe Danielyan (born 14 January 1920) first served in the Fifth Army infantry in Ukraine during World War II and was captured no less than five times. After surviving in German and Italian Prisoner of War camps. In 1947 Danielyan was charged by the Soviet government for being a traitor and was imprisoned and sentenced to 15 years of hard labor in a Soviet concentration camp. He was awarded the Prisoner of War medal (6 times) and a Victory Medal from the Soviet Union.

Early life
Vahe Danielyan was born in Istanbul, Ottoman Empire on 14 January 1920. His father, Daniel Danielyan, who was born in Constantinople was a graduate of the French Medical Academy, was a doctor and a therapist. His mother, Eliza Ohanyan, was a housewife who was born in Konya. The family would move to Soviet Armenia in 1924 because his father wanted to "serve his people" and not the Turks. Danielyan attended the local Armenian school for three years. At the age of 20 in 1940, Danielyan was recruited and set to Novocherkassk for Officer's School. He graduated with high honors.

Danielyan speaks Armenian, English, Russian, Ukrainian, German, Turkish, French and Spanish.

World War II
After his graduation, World War II broke out. He was sent to the front and assigned to the Fifth Army. When Danielyan arrived, fighting soon commenced between German and Soviet forces near Kiev. Danielyan describes the event as follows:

Danielyan managed to escape from that camp the very next day with the help of some of his friends who lifted up the barbed wire. He "snaked" his way through and escaped. Danielyan would later remark, "However, the guards were shooting at me, but I was able to get away. So I made my way east with the intention of joining my army."

While walking on foot, Danielyan was captured five times by the German and Italian troops and sent to five POW camps. Danielyan managed to survive and escape from the other camps he had joined. He found that escaping the Italian camps were easier since they were less strict.

When German troops arrived in Rostov on Don, Danielyan lost hope of reaching the Soviet frontier. He turned back and went to a town called Taganrog, hoping to find food, water and shelter:

Famine was widespread throughout the town and Danielyan had no other choice but to go to Germany. While in Germany, he worked in a pipe manufacturing plant and lived in a camp in the Saar region on the bank of the Rhine River.

Post-war period
In the summer of 1945, after the defeat of the Germans, Danieyan returned home to Armenia and worked as an electrical technician.

In 1947 he was charged by the Soviet government for being a traitor and was sentenced to 15 years of hard labor in a Soviet prison camp:

Danielyan was sent north of Siberia to Ukhta where he would build factories, towns, buildings, mines and power stations.

After working in Ukhta for 5 years, he and other prisoners were transferred to another camp. From there he was transferred still farther north to the Taymyr Peninsula, 2,000 kilometers north of Krasnoyarsk, to build the town of Norilsk. He was in the Arctic Circle near the North Ocean.

When Stalin died in 1953, Danielyan was released from the camps and head back to Yerevan, Armenia. He married Nyna Khoetsyan in 1959. They have one daughter, Gohar.

In 2015, Danielyan was interviewed, at the age of 94, about his adherence to a raw food diet, which he attributes to his longevity. His diet is composed of mainly raw fruit and vegetables, and he refrains from eating meat.

References

Bibliography

1920 births
Living people
Military personnel from Istanbul
Armenian people of World War II
Soviet military personnel of World War II
Soviet prisoners of war
Soviet Armenians
Turkish emigrants to the Soviet Union
Armenian centenarians
Men centenarians